Hanna-Barbera Beyond is a comic book initiative started in 2016 by DC Comics that consists in a line of comic books based on various characters from the animation studio Hanna-Barbera.

Publication history
On January 28, 2016, Dan DiDio and Jim Lee announced a new partnership between Hanna-Barbera and DC Comics, both companies owned by Warner Bros. Discovery, in order to remake most of the studio's comedic characters and adapt them into darker and edgier settings.

The first four titles in the line are Future Quest, Scooby Apocalypse, The Flintstones and Wacky Raceland. New titles were released in March 2017.

Titles

Collected editions

References

2016 comics debuts
DC Comics imprints
Hanna-Barbera
Comic book reboots